The Brazilian Gay, Lesbian, Bisexual, Travesti, Transsexual and Intersex Association (Associação Brasileira de Gays, Lésbicas, Bissexuais, Travestis, Transexuais e Intersexos or ABGLT), is a national network made up of 203 member groups, including about 141 gay, lesbian, and trans groups, and about 62 "collaborating" organizations which are involved with human rights and AIDS. Since July 2009, ABGLT has consultative status with the United Nations Economic and Social Council.

It was established by 31 founding groups on January 31, 1995. The organization claims to be the largest LGBT network in Latin America.

See also

Travesti
LGBT rights in Brazil
List of LGBT rights organisations
LGBT rights organization

References

External links
 

LGBT political advocacy groups in Brazil
Organizations established in 1995
LGBT culture in Brazil
Belo Horizonte
Intersex rights organizations